In broadcasting, a channel or frequency channel is a designated radio frequency (or, equivalently, wavelength), assigned by a competent frequency assignment authority for the operation of a particular radio station, television station or television channel.

See also
Frequency allocation, ITU RR, article 1.17
Frequency assignment, ITU RR, article 1.18
Broadcast law
Television channel frequencies

References 

 International Telecommunication Union (ITU)

Broadcasting